County of Yarmouth was a full-rigged ship built in Belliveau's Cove, Nova Scotia in 1884. She was the largest wooden ship ever built for shipowners in Yarmouth County, Nova Scotia, and the second largest wooden ship ever built in Canada, only a few tons less than the ship William D. Lawrence. The ship was one of a series of very large wooden ships proudly named after major shipbuilding counties of Nova Scotia at the end of the Age of Sail. William D. Lovitt, owner of a fleet of ships from Yarmouth, began as the sole owner. The ship enjoyed a profitable decade of service circling the globe several times but most often trading between South American, Canadian and British ports. She survived a serious grounding at Low Point, Cape Breton in 1893. After being dismasted in December 1895, she was to be broken up at Grimsby, England but was purchased by the government of Argentina as a school ship.

References
Record of Canada Shipping, Frederick William Wallace, (Toronto: Musson Books) p. 70
Sailing Ships of the Maritime Charles Armour and Thomas Lackey (Toronto: McGraw-Hill Ryerson, 1975), pp 172–173

External links
"Tall Ships of Atlantic Canada", Art Gallery of Nova Scotia – Registry Information
Ship Portrait, 1885 by Edouard Adam, Yarmouth County Museum & Archives
Ship Portrait, 1887 by Edouard Adam, Yarmouth County Museum & Archives

Maritime history of Canada
Tall ships of Canada
Individual sailing vessels
Ships built in Nova Scotia
Victorian-era merchant ships of Canada
Sailing ships of Canada
1884 ships
Full-rigged ships